Tom Eplin (born October 25, 1960, in Hayward, California) is an American actor known for his run as the character of Jake McKinnon on two soap operas for a combined total of nearly two decades: on Another World (1985–1986, 1988–1999) and on As the World Turns (1999–2002).

Eplin was married to his Another World costar Ellen Wheeler from 1985 to 1988.  His second marriage was to Courtney Gibbs from 1991 to 1995.  Both marriages ended in divorce. In 2011, he welcomed a daughter with his third wife Abilene Crabtree who he married on June 20, 2015, in Danville, California. They welcomed a second daughter September, 2016 and divorced February, 2020.

Filmography

References

1960 births
Living people
American male soap opera actors
People from Hayward, California
Male actors from California